USS LST-550 was a United States Navy  in commission from 1944 to 1946. She also served in a non-commissioned status with the Military Sea Transportation Service as USNS LST-550 (T-LST-550) from 1952.

Construction and commissioning
LST-550 was laid down on 13 November 1943 at Evansville, Indiana, by the Missouri Valley Bridge and Iron Company. She was launched on 9 March 1944, sponsored by Mrs. Henry D. Hoover, and commissioned on 10 April 1944.

Service history

Commissioned service
During World War II, LST-550 initially was assigned to the European Theater of Operations. She participated in Operation Dragoon, the invasion of southern France, in August and September 1944.

LST-550 subsequently was assigned to the Pacific Theater of Operations, where she took part in the assault on and occupation of Okinawa Gunto in June 1945.

Following the war, LST-550 performed occupation duty in the Far East until late December 1945, when she returned to the United States.

LST-550 was decommissioned on 13 January 1946.

Non-commissioned service in Military Sea Transportation Service
On 31 March 1952, LST-550 was transferred to the Military Sea Transportation Service, where she served in a non-commissioned status as USNS LST-550 (T-LST-550).

Final disposition
USNS LST-550 was stricken from the Navy List on 1 November 1973. Her ultimate fate awaits further research.

Honors and awards
LST-550 earned two battle stars for World War II service.

References

NavSource Online: Amphibious Photo Archive USS LST-550

 

LST-542-class tank landing ships
World War II amphibious warfare vessels of the United States
Cold War amphibious warfare vessels of the United States
Ships built in Evansville, Indiana
1944 ships